Kariyawasam Pathiranage Sarath Kumarasiri is a Sri Lankan politician, former provincial minister and Member of Parliament.

Kumarasiri was a member of Nochchiyagama Divisional Council and North Central Provincial Council where he held a provincial ministerial portfolio. He contested the 2020 parliamentary election as a Sri Lanka People's Freedom Alliance electoral alliance candidate in Anuradhapura District and was elected to the Parliament of Sri Lanka.

References

Education ministers of Sri Lankan provinces
Local authority councillors of Sri Lanka
Living people
Members of the 16th Parliament of Sri Lanka
Members of the North Central Province Board of Ministers
Sinhalese politicians
Sri Lanka People's Freedom Alliance politicians
Sri Lanka Podujana Peramuna politicians
United People's Freedom Alliance politicians
Year of birth missing (living people)